Oreolalax omeimontis (Omei lazy toad or Omei toothed toad) is a species of amphibian in the family Megophryidae. It is endemic to Sichuan, China where it is found in Mount Emei (its type locality) and in Hongya County. Its natural habitats are subtropical moist montane forests and rivers. It is threatened by habitat loss.

References 

omeimontis
Amphibians of China
Endemic fauna of Sichuan
Taxonomy articles created by Polbot
Amphibians described in 1960
Endangered Fauna of China